Caribou Mountain is a mountain on the Canada–United States border, the section of which follows the height of land of the Saint Lawrence River watershed. The peak is located about  inside Franklin County, Maine. The southwest end of Caribou's summit ridge is in Le Granit Regional County Municipality, Québec.

The northwest side of Caribou Mountain drains into the West Branch of the Moose River, thence into the South Branch of the Moose, the Moose River, and the Kennebec River, then into the Gulf of Maine. The southeast side of Caribou Mountain drains into Number Six Brook, then into the South Branch of the Moose River. The southwest end of Caribou Mountain drains into Rivière aux Araignées in Saint-Augustin-de-Woburn, Quebec, then into Lac aux Araignées, Lac Mégantic, the Rivière Chaudière, the Saint Lawrence River, and into the Gulf of Saint Lawrence.

References

See also 
 List of mountains in Maine
 New England Fifty Finest

Mountains of Franklin County, Maine
One-thousanders of Quebec
Landforms of Estrie
Canada–United States border
International mountains of North America
Mountains of Maine